Chahar Rudbar (also Romanized as Chahār Rūdbār; also known as Chahār Deh-e Rūdbār) is a village in Chahardangeh Rural District, Chahardangeh District, Sari County, Mazandaran Province, Iran. At the 2006 census, its population was 28, in 8 families.

References 

Populated places in Sari County